Anne Ceridwen Rees (July 9, 1874 – October 19, 1905) was a Welsh physician who practiced in New Jersey.

Early life
Anne Ceridwen Rees was born in Pentregwenlais, Carmarthenshire. Her parents were Edwin and Mary E. Rees; her mother was also known in literary circles as Dyffrynferch. She attended Gwynfryn Academy, where she studied with Watcyn Wyn. In 1892, she moved to America, to pursue medical training at the Woman's Medical College at the New York Infirmary. She earned her M. D. in 1898.

Career
Rees lived with her aunt and uncle, and built a medical practice in Union Hill, New Jersey during her short career. Her work was cited as a reason for her early death in obituaries: "Her constitution, undermined by the years of hard work, proved unequal to the demands made upon it."

Personal life
Rees died from pneumonia in 1905, age 31. Her funeral service was conducted in both Welsh and English, in New Jersey. A poem titled "Ann", in memory of Anne Ceridwen Rees, was published in 1906.

References

1874 births
1905 deaths
19th-century Welsh medical doctors
People from Carmarthenshire
Women physicians
19th-century American physicians
People from Union City, New Jersey
19th-century American women physicians
British emigrants to the United States